Greatest Hits 1977–1990 is a compilation album by the Stranglers, released in November 1990 by Epic Records. It contains hit singles selected from their back catalogue from both EMI and Epic Records.

The album peaked at No. 4 on the UK Albums Chart and proved to be the band's best selling compilation, eventually spending 47 weeks in the chart (their longest UK chart residency with an individual release).
It was certified platinum for 300,000 sales in the UK.

Track listing
All tracks are written by the Stranglers, except where noted.

 "Peaches" from Rattus Norvegicus, 1977
 "Something Better Change" from No More Heroes, 1977
 "No More Heroes" from No More Heroes
 "Walk On By" (Burt Bacharach, Hal David) Non-album single, 1978
 "Duchess" from The Raven, 1979
 "Golden Brown" from La folie, 1981
 "Strange Little Girl" (Jet Black, Jean-Jacques Burnel, Hugh Cornwell, Dave Greenfield, Hans Wärmling) from The Collection 1977-1982, 1982
 "European Female" from Feline, 1983
 "Skin Deep" from Aural Sculpture, 1984
 "Nice in Nice" from Dreamtime, 1986
 "Always the Sun" (Sunny Side Up Mix) from Dreamtime
 "Big in America" from Dreamtime
 "All Day and All of the Night" (Ray Davies) from All Live and All of the Night, 1988
 "96 Tears" (Rudy Martinez) from 10, 1990
 "No Mercy"  (CD and cassette bonus track) from Aural Sculpture

Personnel
See original albums for full credits.

The Stranglers
 Hugh Cornwell – guitar, vocals
 Dave Greenfield – keyboards
 Jean-Jacques Burnel – bass, vocals
 Jet Black – drums 

Technical

 Martin Rushent – production (1-4)
 The Stranglers – production (5-13)
 Alan Winstanley – production (5)
 Steve Churchyard – production (6-8)
 Laurie Latham – production (9, 15)
 Mike Kemp – production (10-12)
 Ted Hayton – production (13)
 Roy Thomas Baker – production (14)
 Jean Luke Epstein (Graphyk) – design  
 Grant Louden (Graphyk) – design
 Mike Prior – photography 
 Chris Twomey – liner notes

References

1990 greatest hits albums
The Stranglers compilation albums
Epic Records compilation albums